The 41st International 500-Mile Sweepstakes was held at the Indianapolis Motor Speedway on Thursday, May 30, 1957. The event was part of the 1957 USAC National Championship Trail and it was race 3 of 8 in the 1957 World Championship of Drivers.

Sam Hanks won the Indianapolis 500 in his thirteenth attempt (the most such by any 500 winner). He retired from competition at Indy in victory lane. Contrary to popular belief, Hanks did not completely retire from racing until the end of the year. He skipped the Race of Two Worlds when his entrant withdrew, but competed in USAC Stock Car events later in the year, winning the event at Trenton, and finished third in points championships for 1957.

Hanks received a record $103,844 purse, the first driver to win a $100,000 single-race payday. The total race purse was also a record, over $300,000 for the first time.

Hanks won the race in George Salih's "Lay-down Offy". The Offenhauser engine was mounted on its side and shifted off-center. This was done in order to lower the center of gravity, reduce frontal area, and counterbalance the body roll in the turns. The car that Hanks drove for the win in 1957 would win back-to-back Indy 500s, with Jimmy Bryan piloting the very same chassis to victory again in 1958.

Track improvements
For 1957, the Speedway introduced a new state-of-the-art pit lane and brand new Master Control Tower to house broadcasting as well as timing and scoring. For the first time, the pit area was separated from the mainstretch by an inside wall. The pit lane was paved in concrete (the mainstretch remained brick), while a grass strip went the length of the pit road to accommodate pit crew sign board men. Flagging duties would be done from a station on the grass strip at the start/finish line, and eventually a small wooden platform would be constructed for the flagman to stand atop. USAC officials also stationed themselves on the new grass parapet.

For the 1957 race, the field lined up in the pit area single-file, rather than the traditional eleven rows of three on the racing surface. On the pace lap, the field assembled into position, and was aligned for the green flag. By 1957, the field was now being taken around for two warm-up laps (one "parade" lap, and one "pace" lap), an increase over the single lap used previously. This single-file grid practice would eventually lead to confusion, and was utilized for only two years.

Practice and time trials
Time trials was scheduled for four days, but the second day was rained out. Rain affected practice days as well.

Giuseppe Farina was the only European driver on the entry list for the race, however, he did not attempt to qualify. Farina had difficulty getting his car up to speed, and had experienced handling problems. On May 15, his teammate Keith Andrews stepped into his car for a test run, but crashed. Down the frontstretch, Andrews began to slide, and when he attempted to correct, the car backed into the inside wall separating the pit area. Andrews was crushed to death between the cowl and the fuel tank, but no fire broke out. Farina withdrew after Andrews was killed, with no backup car to use.

Saturday May 18 – Pole Day time trials

Pat O'Connor qualified for the pole position. Showers delayed qualifying for nearly four hours, and at other points during the afternoon. A total of only nine cars completed runs.

O'Connor's speed of 143.948 mph was not a track record. Troy Ruttman was on the track, and after a lap of over 144 mph, rain forced him to abort the attempt. He was able to get back out to the track, but had to settle for a speed of only 142.772 mph.

The first rookie to make the field was Elmer George, the husband of Mari Hulman George, and son-in-law of Speedway president Tony Hulman.

Sunday May 19 – Second day time trials

The second day scheduled for qualifying was rained out.

Saturday May 25 – Third day time trials

Paul Russo (144.817 mph) was the fastest driver of the day, in one of the Novi Specials. Russo was the fastest qualifier in the field, as his speed was faster than the pole position time from the previous weekend.

Sunday May 26 – Fourth day time trials

Rain and winds plagued the final day of time trials. Twenty three cars entered the day looking to fill the final 11 positions. A total of 43 attempts were made, with 9 cars bumped.

Tony Bettenhausen (142.439 mph) was the fastest driver of the day, driving one of the 500 hp Novi Specials. 
Bill Cheesbourg needed two cars to make the field. His first attempt was too slow. But late in the day, he got in Cliff Griffith's car, and at a speed of 141.565 mph, bumped Johnnie Parsons from the lineup.

Qualifying results

Grid

First alternate

Failed to Qualify

 = Indianapolis 500 rookie = Former Indianapolis 500 winner

Race summary

First half
On the backstretch during the pace lap, Elmer George hit the back of Eddie Russo's car, putting both cars out of the race before the start. Only 31 cars took the green flag.

Polesitter Pat O'Connor took the lead at the start and led the first four laps. Troy Ruttman led laps 5–6. O'Connor re-took the lead for laps 7–9, but Ruttman led laps 10–11, until blowing the engine. Paul Russo took the lead on lap 12, and in the first twelve laps there had already been four lead changes between three drivers.

Second half
Sam Hanks took the lead for the final time on lap 135.

Race results

Box score

Notes
 – Includes 1 point for fastest lead lap.
 = Indianapolis 500 rookie
 = Former Indianapolis 500 winner

Race notes 
 Fastest Lead Lap: Jim Rathmann – 1:02.75
 Sam Hanks was the only driver in the field using the British made Lodge Spark Plugs. The other 32 drivers all had the American Champion brand installed.
Dick Rathmann qualified, but was mugged the night before the race. He was replaced in the car by Johnnie Parsons.
First Indianapolis 500 starts for Eddie Sachs, Mike Magill, Bill Cheesbourg, and Elmer George.
Only Indianapolis 500 start for Don Edmunds.
Last Indianapolis 500 starts for Sam Hanks, Andy Linden, Marshall Teague, and Fred Agabashian.

Broadcasting

Radio
The race was carried live on the IMS Radio Network. Sid Collins served as chief announcer. The broadcast was carried by 302 affiliates, including Latin America. It reached 46 states and DC. The broadcast came on-air at 10:45 a.m. local time, fifteen minutes prior to the start of the race. For the fifth years, the network featured announcers from the five major radio stations in Indianapolis (WISH, WIRE, WIBC, WFBM, and WISH). For 1957, the crew was expanded to eleven, with three new remote reporting locations. For the first time, there would be a reporter in each of the four turns, and a third pit reporter was added to help cover the recently lengthened pit lane. In addition, the booth announcers moved into the newly-constructed Master Control Tower along the frontstretch.

Charlie Brockman conducted the winner's interview in victory lane.

Championship standings after the race 
World Drivers' Championship standings

Note: Only the top five positions are included.

USAC National Championship Trail standings

Gallery

References

External links
Indianapolis 500 History: Race & All-Time Stats – Official Site
Van Camp's Pork & Beans Presents: Great Moments From the Indy 500 – Fleetwood Sounds, 1975
500 Miles to Glory: Mercury LP record, 1957

Indianapolis 500
Indianapolis 500
Indianapolis 500 races
Indianapolis 500
Indianapolis 500
Indianapolis 500